The Sarah P. Duke Gardens consist of approximately  of landscaped and wooded areas at Duke University located in Durham, North Carolina. The gardens are divided into four areas, the Historic Core and Terraces, the H.L Blomquist Garden of Native Plants, the William Louis Culberson Asiatic Arboretum and the Doris Duke Center Gardens (including the Page-Rollins White Garden). The gardens are a memorial to Sarah Pearson Angier Duke, mother of Mary Duke Biddle and wife of Benjamin N. Duke, one of Duke University's benefactors.

History 
In the early 1920s, Duke University's planners intended to turn the area where the Sarah P. Duke Gardens are currently located into a lake. Funds for this project ran short and the idea was subsequently abandoned.  The gardens then officially began in 1934, when Dr. Frederic Moir Hanes, a faculty member at the Duke Medical School, persuaded Sarah P. Duke to give $20,000 to finance the planting of flowers in the debris-filled ravine.  By 1935, over 100 flower beds consisting of 40,000 irises, 25,000 daffodils, 10,000 small bulbs and assorted annuals graced the lawns.  Unfortunately, the heavy rains of that summer and the flooding stream completely washed away the original gardens.  By the time Sarah. P. Duke died in 1936, the gardens were completely destroyed.  Dr. Hanes was able to convince Sarah P.Duke's daughter, Mary Duke Biddle, to finance a new garden on higher ground as a memorial to her mother.  Ellen Biddle Shipman, a pioneer in American landscape design, was chosen to create the new garden, known as the Terraces, in the Italianate style.  They are considered by many to be her greatest work.

Trivia 
The 36th line of latitude goes directly through the Duke Gardens; there is a plaque designating a spot through which the parallel runs.

Gallery

See also 
List of botanical gardens in the United States
List of botanical gardens in the United Kingdom

External links 

 Sarah P. Duke Gardens
 Duke University

Duke University campus
Botanical gardens in North Carolina
Duke family
Protected areas of Durham County, North Carolina